The Great Male Renunciation is the historical phenomenon at the end of the 18th century in which Western men stopped using brilliant or refined forms in their dress, which were left to women's clothing. Coined by psychoanalyst John Flügel in 1930, it is considered a major turning point in the history of clothing in which the men relinquished their claim to adornment and beauty. The Great Renunciation encouraged the establishment of the suit's monopoly on male dress codes at the beginning of the 19th century.

History
The Great Male Renunciation began in the mid-18th century, inspired by the ideals of the Enlightenment; clothing that signaled aristocratic status fell out of style in favor of functional, utilitarian garments. The newfound practicality of men's clothing also coincided with the articulation of the idea that men were rational and that women were frivolous and emotional.

During the French Revolution, wearing dress associated with the royalist Ancien Régime made the wearer a target for the Jacobins. Working-class men of the era, many of whom were Revolutionaries, came to be known as sans-culottes because they could not afford silk breeches and wore less expensive pantaloons instead. The term was first used as an insult by French officer Jean-Bernard Gauthier de Murnan but was reclaimed by these men around the time of the Demonstration of 20 June 1792.

In the United States, the movement was associated with American republicanism, with Benjamin Franklin giving up his wig during the Revolution, and later the Gold Spoon Oration of 1840 denouncing Martin Van Buren.

The post-Renunciation standards for men's dress went largely unchallenged in the Western world before the rise of the counterculture and increased informality in the 1960s.

Characteristics
Dark-colored or black clothing became the standard for men's apparel during the Renunciation. High heels, adopted in Europe at the beginning of the 17th century based on Persian riding shoes, fell out of fashion for men by the 1740s. The tight-fitting breeches that suggested better tailoring and accentuated the strength of the male figure, particularly the legs, were replaced by pantaloons. Stockings and expensive wigs and fabrics were also abandoned.

See also
Beau Brummell
Men's Dress Reform Party
Midnight blue, a color popularized by the Duke of Windsor as an alternative to black clothing
Black tie

References

18th-century fashion
Men's culture
Male beauty